Volodymyr Olehovich Hoza (also transliterated Goza, born 15 April 1996) is a Ukrainian male weightlifter, competing in the 94 kg category and representing Ukraine at international competitions. He participated in the men's 94 kg event at the 2015 World Weightlifting Championships, and at the 2016 Summer Olympics, finishing in ninth position.

Major results

References

External links
 
 
 
 
 

1996 births
Living people
Ukrainian male weightlifters
Olympic weightlifters of Ukraine
Weightlifters at the 2016 Summer Olympics
People from Zhydachiv
21st-century Ukrainian people